Isabel Sanford's Honeymoon Hotel is an American sitcom that was broadcast in first-run syndication in January 1987. The stripped series, airing five days a week, was created to showcase Isabel Sanford's comedic skills, but it failed to attract an audience and was quickly cancelled. The title of the series may have likely been inspired by an episode from the tenth season of The Jeffersons called "Honeymoon Hotel".

Premise
Isabel Scott is a divorcee who runs Isabel's Honeymoon Hotel, a once profitable but now debt-ridden inn. Accompanying Isabel are her ex-husband K.C., her niece Jolie, her assistants Martha and Carlton, Mel the bartender, and Anges the chambermaid.

Cast
Isabel Sanford as Isabel Scott
Ernie Banks as K.C.
Renee Jones as Jolie
Rhonda Bates as Martha
John Lawlor as Carlton
Earl Boen as Mel
Lana Schwab as Agnes
Miguel Nunez as Rooster

Casey Kasem was the program's announcer. Guest stars included Lydia Cornell, Kelly Monteith, David Lander, and Marcia Wallace.

Series development
It was produced by De Laurentiis Entertainment Group in association with Fred Silverman. The plan was to have 100 new episodes made by the fall of 1987.

It debuted as a "pilot week" on several stations in January 1987. However, DEG went bankrupt before production was to fully start, thereby cancelling the show.

References

External links
 

1987 American television series debuts
1987 American television series endings
First-run syndicated television programs in the United States
English-language television shows
1980s American black sitcoms
Fictional hotels